Nisoscolopocerus is a genus of leaf-footed bugs in the family Coreidae. There are at least two described species in Nisoscolopocerus.

Species
These two species belong to the genus Nisoscolopocerus:
 Nisoscolopocerus apiculatus Barber, 1928
 Nisoscolopocerus schuhi Brailovsky, 2012

References

Further reading

 

Articles created by Qbugbot
Coreini
Coreidae genera